Kish Mahalleh (also Romanized as Kīsh Maḩalleh; also known as Kīshmaḩalleh-ye Chushal) is a village in Malfejan Rural District, in the Central District of Siahkal County, Gilan Province, Iran. At the 2006 census, its population was 134, in 38 families.

References 

Populated places in Siahkal County